A Coptic Orthodox patriarch has the same name, Pope Cosmas II of Alexandria (851–858), commemorated in the Coptic Synaxarion on the 21st day of Hathor.

Cosmas III was the Ecumenical Patriarch of Constantinople from 1714 to 1716. He also served as Greek Patriarch of Alexandria under the episcopal name Cosmas II from 1723 until his death in 1736.

References

1736 deaths
Year of birth missing
18th-century Ecumenical Patriarchs of Constantinople
18th-century Greek Patriarchs of Alexandria